Narayanaswami Srinivasan (born 3 January 1945) is an Indian industrialist. He is a former Chairman of the International Cricket Council (ICC) and former President of the BCCI, the governing body for cricket in India. He is also the managing director of India Cements Limited. He is the owner of Indian Premier League (IPL) team Chennai Super Kings. 

Srinivasan is being investigated in several scams, including one involving betting on IPL cricket matches, where his son-in-law Gurunath Meiyappan has been indicted for passing inside information to bookies. He is also being investigated for corruption involving politician Jagan Mohan Reddy. In March 2014, the Supreme Court of India ordered him to quit as BCCI president to facilitate investigations into the IPL betting scam.

On 26 June 2016, N. Srinivasan was re-elected president of Tamil Nadu Cricket Association. The election was held during the TNCA's 86th annual general meeting, in Chennai and he was re-elected unopposed as the president of the state association.

Early life and education 
Srinivasan was born at Kallidaikurichi, Tirunelveli district, Tamil Nadu. He is the son of T. S. Narayanaswami, one of the first employees of India Cements. He did his schooling in Madras Christian College Higher Secondary School. He holds a Bachelor of Science from Loyola College, Chennai and Master of Science degree in Chemical Engineering from the Illinois Institute of Technology, Chicago, United States.

Sports administration
He was introduced to cricket administration by former BCCI president A. C. Muthiah.
He was the Secretary of the BCCI before becoming the President, taking over the reins from Shashank Manohar, in 2011. He was succeeded by Jagmohan Dalmiya in 2014. His company India Cements owns Indian Premier League (IPL) franchise team Chennai Super Kings and he is the president of the Tamil Nadu Cricket Association (TNCA). Srinivasan is also the President of the Tamil Nadu Golf Federation and former President of the All India Chess Federation. Narayanaswami Srinivasan was elected as president of the Tamil Nadu Cricket Association for the 14th consecutive time at its 85th Annual General Meeting in Chennai, on 12 June 2015. Srinivasan is heading the TNCA since 2002–03, when he ended the reign of former BCCI president A.C. Muthiah. Srinivasan became the first chairman of the ICC On 26 June 2014. On 9 November 2015, he was removed as ICC Chairman.

Corporate career 
Srinivasan took over as vice-chairman and managing director of India Cements in 1989. N. Srinivasan made a hostile takeover bid to Andhra Pradesh-based Raasi Cements in 90's and merged with India Cements. Later he made a bid for Yerraguntla plant of the public sector Cement Corporation of India (CCI) and annexed it to India Cements.

He served as the President of the Madras Chamber of Commerce and Industry from 1996 to 1998 and is a member of the Executive Committee of Federation of Indian Chambers of Commerce and Industry (FICCI). Between 1991 and 2006, he was the President of the Cement Manufacturers' Association for five terms and chairman of the board of Governors of the National Council for Cement and Building Materials (NCCBM) for four terms between 1991 and 2006. He was also the Chairman of Development Council for Cement Industry (DCCI) constituted by the Government of India for two terms from 1992 to 1996. Srinivasan was also the President of The Madras Chamber of Commerce and Industry (MCCI) for two terms between 1996 and 1998. In 2000–2001, he was President of the All India Organisation of Employers. He was also a member of the Prime Minister's Council of Trade and Industry (1996–2001). N. Srinivasan was the Sheriff of Madras for two terms during the period 1989 to 1991.

Controversies
The BCCI regulation, Clause 6.2.4 stated that "no administrator of BCCI could have had, directly or indirectly, any commercial interest in the matches or events conducted by the cricket board". Later, after the start of IPL in 2008, the clause was amended to give unfavorable benefit to BCCI members such that they can own stakes in the IPL franchise. N. Srinivasan became the owner of Chennai Super Kings. The case against N. Srinivasan on the grounds of conflict of interest is still pending in the Supreme Court of India.

In 2013, under the massive Indian Premier League Spot fixing controversy, N. Srinivasan's son-in-law and CSK team principal Gurunath Meiyappan was arrested by Mumbai Police under the involvement in heavy betting and trading of inside information to bookies. Despite media and national outrage asking for his resignation, he remained defiant. But ultimately, he stepped aside on 2 June 2013 and appointed Jagmohan Dalmiya as the interim president. On 27 September, Supreme Court restrained him from holding the post of BCCI President until its further orders. On 8 October 2013 Supreme Court allows N. Srinivasan to take charge as BCCI President.

On 10 February 2014, a report submitted by the retired High Court Chief Justice Mukul Mudgal-led committee, indicted Mr. Srinivasan's son-in-law, Gurunath Meiyappan of illegal betting and passing on sensitive match-related information to bookies during IPL 2013. The 170-page report also stated that Srinivasan's company, India Cements was liable for Meiyappan's actions and that the Chennai Super Kings franchise was in violation of the franchise agreement, which may result in the termination of the Indian Premier League franchise. On 21 March, Meiyappan's voice was found to match a tapped phone conversation discussing match fixing activities

On 25 March 2014 the Supreme Court of India told N. Srinivasan to step down as BCCI president so that a fair investigation may be conducted. The court found it "nauseating" that he should hold on to the post despite various courts censuring him.

On 27 November 2014 the Supreme Court said that N Srinivasan's conflict of interest was "obvious" as he also owned a team i.e. CSK in the IPL. The court also asked BCCI if it was open to have a fresh poll for a new board without N Srinivasan. On 29 March 2015, Srinivasan gave away the Cricket World Cup trophy to the winning Australian team - an act that should have been performed by the ICC President Mustafa Kamal. Prior to the final, Kamal had made controversial statements regarding umpiring in the India-Bangladesh quarterfinals. In light of these comments, ICC reportedly had a meeting, and decided that Kamal would not be allowed to hand over the trophy. Srinivasan had also expressed his extreme unhappiness over Kamal's comments in the same meeting, causing an embarrassed Kamal to walk out of the final before the match even finished. He later quit his position as the President, and vowed to expose the people behind the "mischievousness".

Srinivasan was one of the main investors in several of Jaganmohan Reddy's "suitcase companies" and is a subject of investigation in the Rs. 3000 crore corruption case.  It is charged that his India Cements had invested more than a hundred crores in Jagan's Bharti Cement, in return for quid pro quo favours granted while Jagan's father Y.S. Rajasekhara Reddy was the Chief Minister of Andhra Pradesh (between 2004 and 2009). The Central Bureau of Investigation (CBI) is of the opinion that Srinivasan's company, India Cements allegedly invested Rs. 140 crore into Jaganmohan's businesses in return for the benefits it received from the then government. He has appeared in front of the special CBI court repeatedly in this massive corruption case.

Personal life
Srinivasan is married to Chitra Srinivasan and the couple have two children: Rupa and Ashwin. Srinivasan's younger brother, N Ramachandran is also involved in sports administration as the head of the Tamil Nadu Squash Rackets Association, president of the Indian Olympic Association and the chief of World Squash Federation. His daughter Rupa is married to film producer Gurunath Meiyappan who was part of the IPL match fixing scandal and was president of Tamilnadu cricket association.

References 

1945 births
Living people
People from Chennai
Loyola College, Chennai alumni
Indian cricket administrators
Indian businesspeople in cement
Presidents of the Board of Control for Cricket in India
Chairmen of the International Cricket Council
Sheriffs of Madras
Indian Premier League franchise owners
India Cements